Maciej Ambrosiewicz (born 24 May 1998) is a Polish professional footballer who plays as a midfielder for Bruk-Bet Termalica Nieciecza.

Club career
Ambrosiewicz started his professional career with Górnik Zabrze.

On 21 August 2019, Ambrosiewicz joined Ekstraklasa club Wisła Płock on a two-year deal.

References

External links

Maciej Ambrosiewicz at Wisła Płock's website

1998 births
Living people
Polish footballers
Poland under-21 international footballers
Poland youth international footballers
Polish expatriate footballers
Association football midfielders
Górnik Zabrze players
Wisła Płock players
Zagłębie Sosnowiec players
Bruk-Bet Termalica Nieciecza players
Ekstraklasa players
I liga players
Sportspeople from Ruda Śląska
Sportspeople from Gdynia
Polish expatriate sportspeople in the Czech Republic
Expatriate footballers in the Czech Republic
21st-century Polish people